Aleksa Gold (born 3 January 2000) is an Estonian swimmer. She competed in the women's 200 metre freestyle at the 2019 World Aquatics Championships and she did not advance to compete in the semi-finals.

References

External links
 

2000 births
Living people
Estonian female freestyle swimmers
Place of birth missing (living people)
Swimmers at the 2018 Summer Youth Olympics
21st-century Estonian women
Estonian expatriate sportspeople in Canada